The 2019 Queen's Club Championships (also known as the Fever-Tree Championships for sponsorship reasons) was a tennis tournament played on outdoor grass courts. It was the 117th edition of the event and part of the ATP Tour 500 series of the 2019 ATP Tour. It took place at the Queen's Club in London, United Kingdom from 17 to 23 June.

Points and prize money

Point distribution

Prize money 

*per team

ATP singles main-draw entrants

Seeds

1 Rankings are as of June 10, 2019.

Other entrants
The following players received wildcards into the main draw:
  Jay Clarke
  Dan Evans
  Feliciano López

The following player received entry as a special exempt:
  Adrian Mannarino

The following players received entry from the qualifying draw:
  Aljaž Bedene
  Alexander Bublik
  Nicolas Mahut
  James Ward

The following player received entry as a lucky loser:
  Roberto Carballés Baena

Withdrawals
Before the tournament
  Adrian Mannarino → replaced by  Roberto Carballés Baena

During the tournament
  Juan Martín del Potro

ATP doubles main-draw entrants

Seeds

1 Rankings are as of June 10, 2019.

Other entrants
The following pairs received wildcards into the doubles main draw:
  Luke Bambridge /  Jonny O'Mara
  Dan Evans /  Ken Skupski

The following pair received entry from the qualifying draw:
  Jérémy Chardy /  Fabrice Martin

The following pair received entry as lucky losers:
  Robert Lindstedt /  Artem Sitak

Withdrawals
Before the tournament
  Juan Martín del Potro

Finals

Singles

  Feliciano López defeated  Gilles Simon, 6–2, 6–7(4–7), 7–6(7–2)

Doubles

  Feliciano López /  Andy Murray defeated  Rajeev Ram /  Joe Salisbury, 7–6(8–6), 5–7, [10–5]

Wheelchair singles

  Alfie Hewett defeated  Gordon Reid, 6–2, 7–5

Wheelchair doubles
  Joachim Gérard /  Stefan Olsson defeated  Alfie Hewett /  Gordon Reid, 6–1, 6–0

References

External links
 Official website
 ATP Tour website